Oak Ridge is a city in Anderson and Roane counties in the eastern part of the U.S. state of Tennessee, about  west of downtown Knoxville. Oak Ridge's population was 31,402 at the 2020 census. It is part of the Knoxville Metropolitan Area. Oak Ridge's nicknames include the Atomic City, the Secret City, the Ridge, the Town the Atomic Bomb Built, and the City Behind the Fence.

It was constructed with assistance from architectural and engineering firm Skidmore, Owings & Merrill, from 1942 to 1943. Oak Ridge was established in 1942 as a production site for the Manhattan Project—the massive American, British, and Canadian operation that developed the atomic bomb. Being the site of Oak Ridge National Laboratory and Y-12 National Security Complex, scientific and technological development still plays a crucial role in the city's economy and culture in general.

History

The earliest substantial occupation of the Oak Ridge area occurred during the Woodland period (c. 1000 BC – 1000), although artifacts dating to the Paleo-Indian period have been found throughout the Clinch Valley. Two Woodland mound sites—the Crawford Farm Mounds and the Freels Farm Mounds—were uncovered in the 1930s as part of the Norris Basin salvage excavations. Both sites were just southeast of the former Scarboro community. The Bull Bluff site, which was occupied during the Woodland and Mississippian (c. 1000–1600) periods, was uncovered in the 1960s in anticipation of the construction of Melton Hill Dam. Bull Bluff is a cliff immediately southeast of Haw Ridge, opposite Melton Hill Park. The Oak Ridge area was largely uninhabited when Euro-American explorers and settlers arrived in the late 18th century, although the Cherokee claimed the land as part of their hunting grounds.

During the early 19th century, several rural farming communities developed in the Oak Ridge area, namely Edgemoor and Elza in the northeast, East Fork and Wheat in the southwest, Robertsville in the west, and Bethel and Scarboro in the southeast. The European-American settlers who founded these communities arrived in the late 1790s after the American Revolutionary War and after the Cherokee signed the Treaty of Holston, ceding what is now Anderson County to the United States.

A popular legend holds that John Hendrix (1865-1915), a largely unknown local man, predicted the creation of the city of Oak Ridge around 40 years before construction on the project began. Hendrix lacked any formal education, and was a simple logger for much of his life. Following the death of his youngest daughter, Ethel, to diphtheria, and the subsequent departure of his wife and three remaining children, Hendrix began hearing voices in his head. These voices urged him to stay in the woods and pray for guidance for 40 days and 40 nights, which Hendrix proceeded to do. As the story is told, following these 40 days spent in rugged isolation, Hendrix began seeing visions of the future, and sought to spread his prophetic message to any who would listen. According to published accounts, one vision that he described repeatedly was a description of the city and production facilities built 28 years after his death, during World War II.

The version recalled by neighbors and relatives reported:

Hendrix, in light of his tales of prophetic visions, was considered insane by most, and at one point was institutionalized. His grave lies in an area of Oak Ridge now known as the Hendrix Creek Subdivision. There are ongoing concerns over the preservation of his gravestone, as the man who owns the lot adjacent to the grave wishes to build a home there, while members of the Oak Ridge Heritage and Preservation Association are fighting to have a monument placed on the site of his grave.

Manhattan Project

In 1942, the United States federal government chose the area as a site for developing materials for the Manhattan Project. Major general Leslie Groves, military head of the Manhattan Project, liked the area for several reasons. Its relatively low population made acquisition affordable, yet the area was accessible by highway and rail, and utilities such as water and electricity were readily available due to the recent completion of Norris Dam. Finally, the project location was established within a  valley. This feature was linear and partitioned by several ridges, providing natural protection against the spread of disasters at the four major industrial plants—so they wouldn't blow up "like firecrackers on a string".

When the Governor of Tennessee Prentice Cooper was officially handed by a junior officer (a lieutenant) the July 1943 presidential proclamation making Oak Ridge a military district not subject to state control, he tore it up and refused to see the MED engineer, Lieutenant colonel James C. Marshall. The new District Engineer Kenneth Nichols had to placate him. Cooper came to see the project (except for the production facilities under construction) on November 3, 1943; and he appreciated the bourbon-laced punch served (although Anderson County was "dry"). House and dormitory accommodations at the Clinton Engineer Works (CEW) in Oak Ridge and Hanford Engineer Works in Washington State were basic, with coal rather than oil or electric furnaces. But they were of a higher standard than Director Groves wanted, and were better than at Los Alamos. Medical care was provided by Army doctors and hospitals, with civilians paying $2.50 per month ($5 for families) to the medical insurance fund. 

The location and low population helped keep the town a secret, though the settlement grew from 3,000 to 3,750 in 1942 to about 75,000 by 1945. The K-25 uranium separation facility covered , then the largest building in the world. The name "Oak Ridge" was chosen for the settlement in 1943 from suggestions submitted by project employees. The name evoked the settlement's location along Black Oak Ridge, and officials thought the rural-sounding name "held outside curiosity to a minimum". The name wasn't formally adopted until 1949, and the site was referred to as the Clinton Engineer Works or CEW until then. All workers wore badges. The town was surrounded by guard towers and a fence with seven gates.

Unlike the earlier land acquisitions by the Tennessee Valley Authority for Norris Dam—which were still fresh on the minds of many Anderson Countians—the Corps' "declaration of taking" was much more swift and final. Many residents came home to find eviction notices tacked to their doors. Most were given six weeks to evacuate, although several had as little as two weeks. Some were forced out before they received compensation.

By March 1943, the COE had removed the area's earlier communities and established fences and checkpoints. Anderson County lost one-seventh of its land and $391,000 in annual property tax revenue. The manner by which the Oak Ridge area was acquired by the government created a tense, uneasy relationship between the Oak Ridge complex and the surrounding towns that lasted throughout the Manhattan Project. Although the area's original residents were allowed to be buried in existing cemeteries, every coffin was reportedly opened for inspection.

The Corps' Manhattan Engineer District (MED) managed the acquisition and clearing. The K-25, S-50, and Y-12 plants were each built in Oak Ridge to separate the fissile isotope uranium-235 from natural uranium, which consists almost entirely of the isotope uranium-238. During construction of the electromagnets required for the uranium separation process at the Y-12 site, a shortage of copper forced the MED to borrow 14,700 tons of silver bullion from the United States Treasury as a copper substitute in wire for the electromagnet coils. The X-10 site, now the site of Oak Ridge National Laboratory, was established as a pilot plant for production of plutonium using the Graphite Reactor.

Because of the large number of workers recruited to the area for the Manhattan Project, the Army planned a town for project workers at the eastern end of the valley. The time required for the project's completion caused the Army to opt for a relatively permanent establishment rather than an enormous camp.

The architecture firm Skidmore, Owings and Merrill (SOM) was contracted to provide the layout for the town and house designs. SOM Partner John O. Merrill moved to Tennessee to take charge of designing the secret buildings at Oak Ridge. He directed the creation of a town, which soon had  of roads,  of railroad track, ten schools, seven theaters, 17 restaurants and cafeterias, and 13 supermarkets. A library with 9,400 books, a symphony orchestra, sporting facilities, church services for 17 denominations, and a Fuller Brush Company salesman served the new city and its 75,000 residents. No airport was built, for security reasons. Prefabricated modular homes, apartments, and dormitories, many made from cemesto (bonded cement and asbestos) panels, were quickly erected. Streets were laid out in the manner of a "planned community".

The original streets included several main east-to-west roads, namely the Oak Ridge Turnpike, Tennessee Avenue, Pennsylvania Avenue, Hillside Road, Robertsville Road, and Outer Drive. North-to-south oriented streets connecting these main roads were designated "Avenues", and streets branching off from the avenues were designated "Roads", "Places", "Lanes", or "Circles". "Roads" connected two streets, while "Lanes" and "Places" were dead ends. The names of the main avenues generally progressed alphabetically from east to west (e.g., Alabama Avenue in the east, Vermont Avenue in the west), and the names of the smaller streets began with the same letter as the main avenue from which they started (e.g., streets connected to Florida Avenue began with "F").

Construction personnel swelled the wartime population of Oak Ridge to as much as 70,000. The dramatic population increase, and the secret nature of the project, meant chronic shortages of housing and supplies during the war years. The town was administered by Turner Construction Company through a subsidiary named the Roane-Anderson Company. For most residents, however, their "landlord" was known as "MSI" (Management Services, Inc.).

The news of the use of the first atomic bomb against Japan on August 6, 1945, revealed to the people at Oak Ridge what they had been working on.

Segregation
Oak Ridge was developed by the federal government as a segregated community, required by the Southern bloc of Democrats in Congress to authorize funding for the project. Due to generally holding lower-ranked jobs, their assigned dwellings were predominantly government-built "hutments" (one-room shacks) located very close to the Y-12 plant, in the one residential area designated as colored.  Kenneth Nichols, the MED District Engineer, was told by the main construction contractor for the K-25 plant that the Negro construction labor force had a large turnover rate, so Nichols gave permission to set up a separate black women's camp. When Leslie Groves visited the plant with K. T. Keller of Chrysler, Keller saw twelve Negro women sweeping the thirty-foot wide alley between the production units, and said "Nichols, don't you know there is a machine made to sweep a concrete floor like this?" Nichols replied "Sure I do, but these gals can do more than one of those machines". The men now had an opportunity to "fracas" on Saturday night, and labor turnover had reduced. During the war, plans were made for a colored neighborhood of houses equal in quality to those provided for whites, but it was not implemented due to limited resources. After the war, all hutments were dismantled, and a colored neighborhood of permanent houses was developed in the Gamble Valley area of Oak Ridge, which during wartime had been occupied by a white trailer community.

Oak Ridge elementary education prior to 1954 was totally segregated; it was legally part of the Anderson County system though built and operated primarily with federal funds. Black children could attend only the Scarboro Elementary School. Oak Ridge High School was closed to black students, who had to be bused to Knoxville for an education. Starting in 1950, Scarboro High School was established at Scarboro Elementary School to offer classes for African-American students. It operated until Oak Ridge High School was desegregated in the fall of 1955.

In 1953, the Oak Ridge Town Council encouraged desegregation of Oak Ridge High School; this resulted in an unsuccessful attempt by some residents to recall council member Waldo Cohn.

Following the U.S. Supreme Court decision in Brown v. Board of Education (1954) that the segregation of public schools was unconstitutional, Oak Ridge officials changed their policy and desegregated the schools. The nearby high school in Clinton was desegregated in the fall of 1956. It was later bombed and closed. Oak Ridge provided space at a recently vacated elementary school building (the original Linden Elementary School) for the education of high school students from Clinton for two years while Clinton High School was being rebuilt. Robertsville Junior High School, serving the west half of Oak Ridge, was desegregated at the same time as the high school. Elementary schools in other parts of the city and Jefferson Junior High School, serving the east half of the city, were desegregated slowly as African-American families moved into housing outside of Gamble Valley. In 1967, Scarboro Elementary School was closed, and African-American students from Gamble Valley were bused to other schools around the city.

Following the Brown decision, public accommodations in Oak Ridge were also integrated, although this took a number of years. In the early 1960s, Oak Ridge briefly experienced protest picketing against racial segregation in public accommodations, notably outside a local cafeteria and a laundromat.

Since World War II
Two years after World War II ended, Oak Ridge was shifted to civilian control, under the authority of the U.S. Atomic Energy Commission (AEC). The Roane Anderson Company administered community functions, including arranging housing and operating buses, under a government contract. In 1959 the town was incorporated. The community adopted a city manager and City Council form of government rather than direct federal control.

The S-50 liquid thermal diffusion plant was demolished soon after the war. K-25, where uranium was enriched by the gaseous diffusion process until 1985, was demolished in 2013–15. Two of the four major facilities created for the wartime bomb production remain standing:
 Y-12, originally used for electromagnetic separation of uranium, is used for nuclear weapons processing and materials storage.
 X-10, site of a graphite test reactor, is now Oak Ridge National Laboratory (ORNL).

In 1983, the Department of Energy declassified a report showing that significant amounts of mercury had been released from the Oak Ridge Reservation into the East Fork Poplar Creek between 1950 and 1977. A federal court ordered the DOE to bring the Oak Ridge Reservation into compliance with federal and state environmental regulations.

The Department of Energy runs Oak Ridge National Laboratory (ORNL), a nuclear and high-tech research establishment. In June 2018 IBM and the ORNL unveiled Summit, the "world's fastest supercomputer", claimed to be more than twice as powerful as the previous world leader, with a peak performance of 200,000 trillion calculations per second.

Tours of parts of the original facility are available to American citizens from March through November. The tour is so popular that there is a waiting list.

Oak Ridge's scientific heritage is curated in the American Museum of Science and Energy. Its role in the Manhattan Project is preserved in the Manhattan Project National Historical Park (along with sites in Hanford, Washington and Los Alamos, New Mexico), run cooperatively by the National Park Service and the Department of Energy.

Economic development
In 2003, the city extended its borders west beyond the Clinch River boundary for the annexation of the master planned community, the Preserve at Oak Ridge, paving the way for economic growth into the 21st century.

In January 2020, the city council of Oak Ridge approved the "Wilson Street Corridor" project plan, intended to develop and construct a downtown area in the city situated along Wilson Street. The plan consists of a mixed-use development of retail, residential usage, and restaurants with a primary focus of multi-story residential space.

Geography

Immediately northeast of Oak Ridge, the southwestward-flowing Clinch River bends sharply to the southeast for roughly  toward Solway, where it turns again to the southwest. At the K-25 plant, the Clinch turns southwest again and flows for another  to its mouth along the Tennessee River at Kingston. This series of bends creates a half-rectangle formation—surrounded by water on the northeast, east, and southwest—in which Oak Ridge is situated.

The Oak Ridge area is striated by five elongated ridges that run roughly parallel to one another in a northeast-to-southwest direction. In order from west-to-east, the five ridges are Blackoak Ridge—which connects the Elza and K-25 bends of the Clinch and thus "walls off" the half-rectangle—East Fork Ridge, Pine Ridge, Chestnut Ridge, and Haw Ridge. The five ridges are divided by four valleys—East Fork Valley (between Blackoak and East Fork Ridge), Gamble Valley (between East Fork Ridge and Pine Ridge), Bear Creek Valley (between Pine Ridge and Chestnut), and Bethel Valley (between Chestnut and Haw). These ridges and valleys are part of the Ridge-and-Valley Appalachians physiographic province. The main section of the city is located in the northeast, where East Fork and Pine Ridge give way to low, scattered hills. Many of the city's residences are located along the relatively steep northeastern slope of Blackoak Ridge.

The completion of Melton Hill Dam (along the Clinch near Copper Ridge) in 1963 created Melton Hill Lake, which borders the city on the northeast and east. The lakefront on the east side of the city is a popular recreation area, with bicycling trails and picnic areas lining the shore. The lake is also well known as a venue for rowing competitions. Watts Bar Lake, an impoundment of the Tennessee River which covers the lower  of the Clinch, borders Oak Ridge to the south and southwest.

The highest point is Melton Hill  on the DOE reservation, at elevation .

Climate
Like much of the rest of the state, Oak Ridge has a humid subtropical climate (Cfa in the Köppen climate classification); it is part of USDA hardiness zone 7a.

Precipitation is high, averaging  annually, but reaches a low during late summer.

Demographics

2020 census

As of the 2020 United States census, there were 31,402 people, 12,008 households, and 7,641 families residing in the city.

2010 census
As of the 2010 United States Census,  there were 29,330 people, 12,772 households, and 7,921 families residing in the city. The population density was 344.0 people per square mile (132.8/km2). There were 14,494 housing units at an average density of 161.2 per square mile (62.2/km2). The racial makeup of the city was 86.8% White (81.8% non-Hispanic), 8.1% African American, 0.4% Native American or Alaska Native, 2.5% Asian, 0.03% Pacific Islander, 2.0% from other races, and 3.0% from two or more races. Hispanics or Latinos of any race were 4.6% of the population.

There were 12,772 households, with 25.2% having children under the age of 18 living with them, 45.2% being married couples living together, 12.9% having a female householder with no husband present, 3.9% having a male householder with no wife present, and 38.0% being non-families. 33.3% of all households were made up of individuals, and 14.0% had someone living alone who was 65 years of age or older. The average household size was 2.26 and the average family size was 2.86.

The age distribution was 22.0% under the age of 18, 7.1% from 18 to 24, 22.8% from 25 to 44, 28.9% from 45 to 64, and 19.3% who were 65 years of age or older. The median age was 43.5 years. For every 100 females, there were 89.4 males. For every 100 females age 18 and over, there were 86.3 males.

The median income for a household in the city was $48,716, and the median income for a family was $69,333. Full-time, year-round male workers had a median income of $54,316 versus $36,140 for females in the same employment situation. The per capita income for the city was $30,430. About 10.7% of families and 16.0% of the population were below the poverty line, including 28.1% of those under age 18 and 6.7% of those age 65 or over.

Government

Municipal government
Oak Ridge uses the council-manager government system, which was established in 1959 when the city was incorporated. It is governed by a seven-member city council composed of the mayor and six council members.

State government
Oak Ridge is represented in the Tennessee House of Representatives in the 33rd District in Anderson County, and the 32nd district in Roane County, by Representatives John Ragan and Kent Calfee respectively, both of whom are Republican.

In the Tennessee State Senate, Oak Ridge is represented in the 5th district in Anderson County, and the 12th district in Roane County, by Lieutenant Governor of Tennessee and Senator Randy McNally, and Senator Ken Yager respectively, both of whom are Republican.

National government
Oak Ridge is represented in the United States House of Representatives by Republican Chuck Fleischmann of the 3rd congressional district.

Economy

The federal government projects at Oak Ridge are reduced in size and scope, but are still the city's principal economic activity and one of the biggest employers in the Knoxville metropolitan area. The Department of Energy owns the federal sites and maintains a major office in the city. Oak Ridge National Laboratory is the largest multipurpose lab in the Department of Energy's National Laboratory system. It is home to the Spallation Neutron Source, a 1.4 billion dollar project completed in 2006, and "Titan", one of the world's most powerful scientific supercomputers, which has peak performance of more than one quadrillion operations per second.

The Y-12 National Security Complex is a component of the U.S. nuclear weapons complex. The Department of Energy's Environmental Management office is conducting an extensive program of decontamination and decommissioning, environmental cleanup, and waste management to remove or stabilize the hazardous residues remaining from decades of government production and research activities.

The Department of Energy Office of Scientific and Technical Information, which disseminates government research and development information and operates the science.gov website, is located in the city. The Oak Ridge Institute for Science and Education, operated by Oak Ridge Associated Universities, conducts research and education programs for the DOE, Department of Homeland Security, and other federal agencies. The Atmospheric Turbulence and Diffusion Division (ATDD), one of several field divisions of the National Oceanic and Atmospheric Administration (NOAA) Air Resources Laboratory, is also located in the city. ATDD began under AEC sponsorship in 1948 as a Weather Bureau research office providing meteorological information and expertise for the AEC. Currently its main function is to perform air quality-related research directed toward issues of national and global importance.

The nuclear industry continues to grow in Oak Ridge following the demolition of the K-25 site.  Currently planned in Oak Ridge are a nuclear power plant, two nuclear fuel plants, a nuclear research reactor, and a nuclear medicine plant.

Boeing operated a manufacturing plant in the city beginning in the early 1980s, but closed in 2007. IPIX, Remotec (now a subsidiary of Northrop Grumman), and several other technology-based companies have been founded in Oak Ridge, including Greg LeMond's carbon fiber-manufacturing business, LeMond Composites. Several radioactive waste processing companies, including EnergySolutions, have operations in Oak Ridge.

The infrastructure that was new in the 1940s is aging. The once-isolated city is now incorporated into the Knoxville metropolitan area. Oak Ridge is now challenged to blend into the suburban orbit of Knoxville as its heritage as a "super secret" government installation subsides. Changing economic forces have led to continuing changes in the commercial sector. For example, the Oak Ridge City Center, a shopping center built in the 1950s and converted to an indoor shopping mall in the 1980s, sat largely empty in the years leading to its eventual partial demolition  and redevelopment.

Education

The city operates a preschool, four elementary schools enrolling kindergarten through grade 4, two middle schools enrolling grades 5 through 8, and one high school enrolling grades 9 through 12.

In an August 2004 referendum, city voters approved an increase in local sales taxes to fund a $55 million project for Oak Ridge High School. Following demolition of one wing of the main building, construction on the first wall of the new building began in April 2005. Temporary classrooms were set up to house science classes; they will continue to be used for different purposes as the multi-year project progresses.

Roane State Community College has its largest branch campus in Oak Ridge. Other higher education organizations present in the community, but not offering classes locally, include the Oak Ridge Institute for Science and Education, Oak Ridge Associated Universities, and the University of Tennessee Forestry Stations and Arboretum.

Independent schools in the city include the Montessori School of Oak Ridge (preschool and kindergarten founded in 1977), St. Mary's School (Roman Catholic, pre-kindergarten through grade 8), and several preschools. The Oak Ridge Institute for Continued Learning offers a diverse array of educational opportunities for adults.

The Oak Ridge school district was ranked number one in the state of Tennessee, and Oak Ridge High School was ranked the number three high school in the state of Tennessee, in the Niche 2017 Best School Districts.

Media
Oak Ridge is served by a daily newspaper, The Oak Ridger, and was for many years the home of AM radio station WATO.

A smaller daily newspaper in the area was The Oak Ridge Observer, which ceased publication after a nine-year run in January 2014.

Sports
A Minor League Baseball team called the Oak Ridge Pioneers played at the city's Ridgeview Park for one season in 1954. Another team, the Oak Ridge Bombers, played briefly in 1948 before relocating.

Notable people

Notable persons who were born or lived in Oak Ridge:
 Arnold Anderson, chemical engineer on Manhattan Project, consultant for American Indian Policy Review Commission and founder of American Indian Science and Engineering Society (AISES)
 E. Riley Anderson, Tennessee Supreme Court justice
 Jennifer Azzi, former WNBA player and Olympic gold medalist
 General B.B. Bell, retired general, commander of U.S. Forces Korea and previously of U.S. Army, Europe and NATO's Joint Command
 Manson Benedict, nuclear engineering pioneer
 Mike Caldwell, NFL player and coach
 Nikki Caldwell, women's basketball head coach for LSU, grew up in Oak Ridge
 Kenneth Lee Carder, United Methodist Church bishop
 Lee Clayton, country-rock singer/songwriter, composer of "Ladies Love Outlaws"
 Charles Counts, artist, potter, author
 Trae Crowder, comedian and author
 Sheldon Datz, chemist
 Charlie Ergen, co-founder and CEO of EchoStar Communications Corporation, parent company of Dish Network
 Megan Fox, actress, born in Oak Ridge
 Matthew Friedman, film editor
 Jeannine Hall Gailey, author who grew up in Oak Ridge, as described in The Robot Scientist's Daughter
 John H. (Jack) Gibbons, Director of Office of Technology Assessment and White House Office of Science and Technology Policy
 Eugene Guth, physicist
 Elaine Hendrix, actress
 Tee Higgins, NFL Player
 Otis Howard, former NBA player
 Alston Scott Householder, mathematician who invented Householder transformation
 Kathy Johnson, gymnast
 Kai-Fu Lee, Google executive
 Matt McMahon, basketball head coach, Murray State
 Randy McNally, Tennessee Lieutenant Governor since January 10, 2017
 John O. Merrill, architect
 Edgar Meyer, Grammy Award-winning bassist
 Sarah Monette, author
 Karl Z. Morgan, health physics pioneer
 Ward Plummer, physicist
 William G. Pollard, nuclear physicist and Episcopal priest, first director of Oak Ridge Institute of Nuclear Studies (now Oak Ridge Associated Universities); author on Christianity and science
 Ellen Reid, Pulitzer Prize-winning composer 
 Mitch Rouse, actor, director and screenwriter
 Danny Sanders, football player
 Sophia Schubert, professional golfer, resides in Oak Ridge
 William Shepherd, astronaut, commander of Expedition 1, first crew on International Space Station
 Clifford Shull, Nobel Prize-winning physicist
 Gore Verbinski, film director of Pirates of the Caribbean series
 Alvin Weinberg, nuclear physicist
 Ed Westcott, only authorized photographer in Oak Ridge during Manhattan Project
 Richard White, actor, voice of Gaston in Disney's Beauty and the Beast
 Eugene Wigner, Nobel Prize-winning physicist
 Adam Wingard, director
 Herbert York, nuclear physicist
 Herman Postma, physicist and former director of the Oak Ridge National Laboratory

The Oak Ridge Boys draw their name from the group's frequent performances at Oak Ridge National Laboratory during their earliest incarnation under Wally Fowler.

Points of interest

 Alexander Inn, (Retirement Home)
 American Museum of Science and Energy
 Children's Museum of Oak Ridge
 East Tennessee Technology Park, formerly known as the K-25 site
 Manhattan Project National Historical Park, National Park Service and Department of Energy site
 Oak Ridge National Laboratory
 Office of Scientific and Technical Information (OSTI), U.S. Department of Energy
 United Church, The Chapel on the Hill
 University of Tennessee Arboretum
 Y-12 National Security Complex

Sister cities

  Obninsk, Russia
  Naka, Ibaraki, Japan

Notes

References

Further reading
 Charles W. Johnson, Charles O. Jackson, City Behind A Fence: Oak Ridge, Tennessee, 1942–1946. Knoxville, TN: University of Tennessee Press, 1981
 Lindsey A. Freeman, Longing for the Bomb: Oak Ridge and Atomic Nostalgia. Chapel Hill, NC: University of North Carolina Press, 2015.
 Lindsey A. Freeman, This Atom Bomb in Me. Stanford, CA: Redwood Press, 2019.
 Rusell Olwell, At Work in the Atomic City: A Labor and Social History of Oak Ridge, Tennessee. Knoxville, TN: University of Tennessee Press, 2008.

External links

 
 Convention and Visitors Bureau
 Historic photos of Oak Ridge during the Manhattan Project

 
Cities in Tennessee
Planned cities in the United States
Populated places established in 1942
Cities in Anderson County, Tennessee
Cities in Roane County, Tennessee
Manhattan Project sites
Knoxville metropolitan area
Company towns in Tennessee
1942 establishments in Tennessee
East Tennessee
Skidmore, Owings & Merrill
World War II Heritage Cities